Anoop Menon (born 3 August 1976) is an Indian actor, director, screenwriter and lyricist. He worked in television before acting in Malayalam films and has acted in more than 75 films.

Menon won the Kerala State Film Award for Best Supporting Actor and also the Filmfare Award for his performance as the fictional movie star Ajayachandran  in Thirakkatha. He wrote the screenplay and dialogue for films such as  Pakal Nakshatrangal (2008), Cocktail (2010), Beautiful (2011), Trivandrum Lodge (2012), and Hotel California (2013). Actress Shwetha Menon is his cousin.

Personal life

He was born on 3 August 1976 to P. Gangadharan Nair and Indira Menon in Kozhikode. He grew up in Thiruvananthapuram.

Menon was educated at Christ Nagar School, Thiruvananthapuram. He is a law graduate from Government Law College, Thiruvananthapuram (1994  99) and was the first-rank holder from Kerala University. During this period, he used to do compèring for Kairali TV and Surya TV. He met fellow filmmaker and screenplay writer Shankar Ramakrishnan during this time. Both of them were under the tutelage of renowned malayalam director Ranjith. Anoop married Shema Alexander on 27 December 2014. This is Shema's second marriage. Her first husband died of heart attack in 2006. She has a daughter born in 2002.

Career

He began his acting career in Malayalam television serials. He was in two series on Asianet called Swapnam and Megham, the former one directed by K. K. Rajeev. Anoop made his debut as a screenwriter in Pakal Nakshatrangal with Mohanlal playing father and Anoop playing his son.

He also played main character in Thirakkatha by Ranjith, portraying different stages in the life of film star Ajay Chandran, loosely based on the personal life of Kamal Haasan. His co-stars were Priyamani and Prithviraj Sukumaran.

Filmography

All films are in Malayalam language unless otherwise noted.

Director
 King Fish (2022)
 Padma (2022)

 Nalpathukaarante Irupathonnukaari (2023)

Screenwriter
 Pakal Nakshatrangal (2008)
 Anubhav (2009)
 Cocktail (2010) (dialogues)
 Beautiful (2011)
 Trivandrum Lodge (2012)
 David and Goliath (2013)
 Hotel California (2013)
 Gangs of Vadakum nathan (Second segment of D Company (film)) (2013)
 The Dolphins (2014)
Lavender (2015)
 Ente Mezhuthiri Athazhangal (2018)
 Padma (2022)
 Varal (2022)
 king fish (2022)
 Oru Nalpathukaarante Irupathonnukaari  (2023)
 Trivandrum Lodge 2 (2023)
 Madras Lodge (Title Not Yet Confirmed)

Lyricist
Beautiful (2011)
 Mazhaneer Thullikal
 Moovanthiyay
 Nin Viralthumbil
 Raapoovinum

 Namukku Parkkan (2012)
 Kanmani Ninne Njan

 Buddy (2013) 
 Kadalil Kanmashi Pole

 Hotel California  (2013)
 David & Golliyath (2013)
Angry Babies in Love (2014)
The Dolphins (2014)
She Taxi (2015)

Television career
Omanathinkalpakshi (Asianet)-  2005-2006
Swapnam (Asianet)-  2004-2005
Megham (Asianet)   2004-2005
Sthree Janmam (Surya TV)-  2002-2003
Ashtapadi (Surya TV)-  2003-2004
Radhamadhavam(Surya TV)- 2013-2014
 Thadangalpalayam(Asianet)-  2005-2006
 Noble(asianet)-   2004-2005
 Muhoortham(Asianet)-  2004-2005
Madhavam-   2007-2008
Mounaragam (Asianet)- Promo Voice over 2019

Awards

Asianet Film Awards
 2012 - Asianet Film Awards for Special Jury Award - Various Films
Kerala State Film Awards
 2014 - Second Best Actor - 1983, Vikramadithyan
 2008 - Second Best Actor - Thirakkatha

Filmfare Awards South
 2008 - Filmfare Award for Best Supporting Actor - Thirakkatha

South Indian International Movie Awards 
 2011 - Best Lyricist for "Mazhaneerthullikal" - Beautiful
Vanitha Film Awards
2011 - Best Supporting actor  - Beautiful
Asiavision Awards
2011 - Best Supporting actor  - Traffic
2012 - Trendsetter - Beautiful
Asianet Family award
2005 - Best Son in law - Swapnam

References

Tamil Cinema News - Anoop Menon Images - Maalaimalar.com Maalaimalar

External links
 Anoop Menon MSI Profile Page
 
 
 Personal blog
 Anoop Menon Official Fan Page - Malayalam Box Office (MBO)
 Beautiful is inspired by a wheelchair-bound schoolmate
 Beautiful is a milestone in Malayalam cinema
 എഴുത്തിലെ പുതുനക്ഷത്രം

Living people
Kerala State Film Award winners
Writers from Kozhikode
Filmfare Awards South winners
Male actors from Kozhikode
Male actors in Malayalam cinema
Indian male film actors
Indian male television actors
Male actors in Malayalam television
21st-century Indian dramatists and playwrights
21st-century Indian male actors
Malayalam-language lyricists
Malayalam screenwriters
Screenwriters from Kerala
1976 births
21st-century Indian screenwriters
Government Law College, Thiruvananthapuram alumni